

Ælfhun was a medieval Bishop of London.

Ælfhun was consecrated between 1002 and 1004. He died between 1015 and 1018.

Citations

References

External links
 

Bishops of London
11th-century English Roman Catholic bishops
1010s deaths
Year of birth unknown